Supreme Soviet elections were held in Abkhazia on 29 September 1991, with a second round on 14 October. A third round was held in twelve constituencies where voter turnout had been below the 50% threshold on 1 December.

Electoral system
The 65 seats in the Supreme Soviet were allocated to different ethnic groups; 28 were reserved for Abkhazians, 26 for Georgians and 11 for the other ethnic groups.

Aftermath
The Supreme Soviet was only able to approve legislation in some areas of policy with a 75% majority. Following the elections, the bloc of Georgian representatives repeatedly rejected decisions, and in June 1992, began boycotting the Soviet.

References

parliamentary
1991